The schedule of public holidays in the United States is largely influenced by the schedule of federal holidays but is controlled by private sector employers who provide 62% of the total U.S. population with paid time off.

Public holidays with paid time off is generally defined to occur on a day that is within the employee's work week. When a holiday occurs on Saturday or Sunday, that holiday is shifted to either Friday or Monday for work purposes. Most employers follow a holiday schedule similar to the federal holidays of the United States observed by government employers and government-regulated employers, with exceptions or additions.

At the discretion of the employer, other non-federal holidays such as New Year's Eve, Christmas Eve and the Day after Thanksgiving are common additions to the list of paid holidays while Columbus Day and Veterans Day are common omissions. Besides paid holidays, there are festival and food holidays that also have wide acceptance based on sales of goods and services that are typically associated with that holiday. Halloween and Valentine's Day are examples of widely celebrated uncompensated holidays.

History 
Public holidays had their origins from established federal holidays that were enacted by Congress. They were typically observed on days that have significance for various sectors of American society and are observed at all levels of society, including government and the private sector. These holidays are typically derived from the history, religions, and cultures of the United States and have changed over time. Major holidays are most commonly observed with paid time off, however, many other holiday celebrations come without time off. 
There are no national holidays on which the law requires all businesses to close. Federal holidays are only established for certain federally chartered and regulated businesses, government contractors, and the city of Washington, DC. All other public holidays are created by the States; most states also allow local jurisdictions (cities, villages, etc.) to establish their own local holidays. As a result, holidays have not historically been governed at the federal level and federal law does not govern business openings.

Some states, however, do restrict certain business activities on some holidays. Business closures are mandated on a few holidays in some states for certain kinds of businesses by blue laws. For example, businesses that operate on more than  cannot open on Thanksgiving in some New England states. The most notable businesses to close on such occasions are car dealerships and liquor stores. Some holidays are observed with community service, depending on the meaning of the holiday. Service is, however, not mandated by any government agencies, whether they be federal, state, or local.

Overview 
, there are eleven annual federal holidays in the United States, and one additional quadrennial holiday (Inauguration Day). Pursuant to the Uniform Monday Holiday Act of 1968 (effective 1971), official holidays are observed on a Monday, except for New Year's Day, Juneteenth, Independence Day, Veterans Day, Thanksgiving, and Christmas.
While all current federal holidays have also been made public holidays in all 50 states, each state is not bound to observe the holidays on the same dates as the federal holidays. Many states also have additional holidays that are not observed by the federal government. Many businesses likewise observe certain holidays as well, which are also not mandated by any government agency.

Since 2000, some city and state-level celebrations of Malcolm X Day and Rosa Parks Day have been created, in addition to the federal Martin Luther King Jr. Day, to embrace the African American community in the form of festivals and parades. Illinois and Berkeley, California are two places where Malcolm X is honored by a legal holiday with offices closed, whereas Missouri honors Rosa Parks on her birthday. Today, the United States is the 85th most ethnically diverse country in the world. Many workplaces celebrate religious observance as well as ethnic holidays, such as Saint Patrick's Day, Kwanzaa, Diwali, Mardi Gras, and Cinco de Mayo, as a matter of best practice.

While the popularity of each public holiday cannot easily be measured, the holiday with the highest greeting card sales is Christmas. Major retail establishments, such as shopping malls and centers, close only on Thanksgiving and Christmas, but remain open on all other holidays (with early closings on Christmas Eve and New Year's Eve, and sometimes on other major holidays). In the face of a rapidly tightening retail market in the 2010s, retailers have increasingly been opening on Thanksgiving evening and night to extend Black Friday and the holiday shopping season, however, the Covid-19 pandemic greatly limited this practice. Virtually all large companies observe and close on the major holidays (New Year's Day, Memorial Day, Independence Day, Labor Day, Thanksgiving, and Christmas). Some non-retail businesses close on the day after Thanksgiving, while others (such as federal banks and post offices) are not allowed to close that day. Some smaller businesses normally open on Sundays will close on Easter Sunday if they expect to have very few customers that day.

Holidays most commonly celebrated 

This is a list of the most commonly celebrated holidays in the United States, not a list of federal holidays.

Holidays observed with paid time off 

The labor force in the United States comprises about 62% (as of 2014) of the general population. In the United States, 97% of the private sector businesses determine what days this sector of the population gets paid time off, according to a study by the Society for Human Resource Management. The following holidays are observed by the majority of U.S. businesses with paid time off:
 New Year's Day and New Year's Eve
 Memorial Day
 Independence Day
 Labor Day
 Thanksgiving and the day after
 Christmas Eve and Christmas

Holidays with religious significance 

Religious and cultural holidays in the United States are characterized by a diversity of religious beliefs and practices. However, the First Amendment to the United States Constitution provides that "Congress shall make no law respecting an establishment of religion, or prohibiting the free exercise thereof...." and Article VI specifies that "no religious Test shall ever be required as a Qualification to any Office or public Trust under the United States." As a result, various religious faiths have flourished, as well as perished, in the United States. A majority of Americans report that religion plays a "very important" role in their lives, a proportion unique among developed nations.

The majority of Americans (73–80%) identify themselves as Christians and about 15–20% have no religious affiliation. According to the American Religious Identification Survey (ARIS) (2008) 76% of the American adult population identified themselves as Christians, with 51% professing attendance at a variety of churches that could be considered Protestant or unaffiliated, and 25% professing Catholic beliefs. The same survey says that other religions (including, for example, Islam, Judaism, Buddhism, and Hinduism) collectively make up about 4% of the adult population, another 15% of the adult population claim no religious affiliation, and 5.2% said they did not know, or they refused to reply. According to a 2012 survey by the Pew forum, 36 percent of Americans state that they attend services nearly every week or more.

Christian holidays 

With 65% of adults in the U.S. identifying as Christian, many holidays from the liturgical calendar are observed by this segment of the population. Many businesses, as well as federal, state, and local governments, are closed on Christmas, arguably the most significant holiday of the Christian religion. A reference in the film A Christmas Story shows a Chinese restaurant being the only establishment open on Christmas.

Some private businesses and certain other institutions are closed on Good Friday. The financial market and stock market is closed on Good Friday. Most retail stores remain open, although some might close early. Public schools and most universities are closed on Good Friday, either as a holiday of its own, or part of spring break. The postal service operates, and banks regulated by the federal government do not close for Good Friday.

Many companies, including banks, malls, shopping centers, and most private retail stores that normally open on Sundays are closed on Easter.

Hindu holidays 

The Hindu holidays of Diwali and Holi are celebrated in some parts of the United States, mostly by Indian Americans or peoples of Indian descent.  Holi, the "festival of colors" has inspired a Broadway musical based on this festival. While not officially recognized in most of the United States, the New York City Council officially recognized these as official school holidays in New York City. CNN reported that the Diwali holiday is shown in American pop culture through an episode of The Office.

Jewish holidays 

The three most commonly celebrated Jewish holidays are Rosh Hashanah, Yom Kippur and Hanukkah. Passover and Yom Kippur in addition to Rosh Hashannah and Hanukkah are recognized as an optional state level holiday in Texas All Jewish holidays start the night before, as that is when the Jewish day begins.

Islamic holidays 

The major Islamic holidays of Ramadan, Eid al-Fitr, and Eid al-Adha have been recognized in the United States. Awareness of these holidays can be found in calendars published by major calendar manufacturers. According to Al-Jazeera, schools in New York and Michigan (mainly Dearborn) may begin to close in observance of all Muslim holidays.

Holidays with other cultural or historical significance

Confederate States of America 
The following holidays memorialize the historic Confederate States of America from the American Civil War:

 Confederate Memorial Day is a public holiday observed by Alabama, Florida, Kentucky, Mississippi, South Carolina, Louisiana and Texas and an unofficially observed holiday in some other states. It is often in late April to align with the final surrender of the last Confederate Army. Texas observes Confederate Heroes Day.
 Confederate History Month has been declared at least once in Alabama, Florida, Georgia, Louisiana, Mississippi, Texas, and Virginia as well as by various cities, usually in April to augment Confederate Memorial Day.
 Robert E. Lee Day (on or around Lee's Jan 19 birthday) is still observed in Alabama and Mississippi combined with Martin Luther King Jr. Day, the only remaining states to do so. It is officially recognized in Florida, but is not widely observed there.
 Arkansas combined the observance of Robert E. Lee Day with Martin Luther King Jr. Day in 1985. In 2017, the state passed a law removing Lee's name from the January holiday and instead establishing a state memorial day on the second Saturday of October in honor of Lee.

Drinking holidays 

According to the National Institutes of Health, about 86% of the population over 18 drinks alcohol recreationally or socially. In the United States, the holidays that are considered the most "festive" are generally regarded as some of the "most drunken holidays." Celebrations usually revolve around barbecues and beer. Although many of these holidays lack any official status, they are generally observed by the drinking culture for the fact that these holidays revolve around drinking. One measurement of the popularity of these holidays is the amount of alcohol purchased for the occasion. One survey names New Year's Eve as the holiday on which the most alcohol is consumed based on sales. While many holidays are listed, some are generally notable for their drinking requirement while others are known for abstinence.

African American holidays 

African Americans make up about 12% of the U.S. population. While some customs have come from abroad, many of the customs were developed inside the United States. Kwanzaa, for example, is a custom that has greatly influenced American culture originating from the turbulent 1960s. Most of the newer holidays revolve around a particular civil rights activist and have recently gained attention from city and state-level governments. At the federal level, there are only three national holidays named for a person, and one of those honors 20th century African American Martin Luther King Jr.; the other two are Washington's Birthday (for George Washington, a major Founding Father of the United States), and Columbus Day (for Italian Christopher Columbus's European discovery of the Americas in 1492).

Other traditional and informal holidays 

In addition to the federal/national holidays, many religious, ethnic, and other traditional holidays populate the calendar, as well as  lighter celebrations. These are rarely observed by businesses as holidays (Except for Easter and most often also on Good Friday); indeed, many are viewed as opportunities for commercial promotion. Because of this commercialization, some critics apply the deprecatory term Hallmark holiday to such days, after the Hallmark greeting card company.

Other notable holidays 

 Opening Day (late March/early April; the beginning of the Major League Baseball season and an unofficial indication that summer is approaching)
 Winter break (two weeks in late winter that schools are off)
 Spring break (one week in early spring that schools are off)
 Summer vacation (summer months in which schools are off)
 Super Bowl Sunday (the second Sunday in February; the day of the National Football League's championship; festivities generally including in-home parties and watching the game on television with beverages and snacks)

See also 

 United States federal observances
 Holidays in Puerto Rico
 List of African-American holidays
 Mexican fiestas in the United States
 Easter controversy
 Christmas controversy
 Hallmark holiday
 Tax holiday
 Work–life balance in the United States

References

External links 
 U.S. Department of Commerce Federal Holiday Calendar
 Text of Federal Holiday Legislation
 Bizarre American Holidays – a comprehensive compilation of special recognition given both to months and individual days. Unfortunately, the origins of the commemorations aren't provided.
 Infoplease: State Holidays
 Federal Holidays: Evolution and Application, CRS Report for Congress, 98-301 GOV, updated February 8, 1999, by Stephen W. Stathis

 
United States
Holidays

ja:アメリカ合衆国#祝祭日